James "Holy" Johnson (c. 1836–1917) was a prominent clergyman and one of the first African members of Nigeria's Legislative Council.

Early life and education
He was born in  Sierra Leone in 1836 to liberated African parents of Yoruba origin. 
Johnson enrolled in a Church Mission Society (CMS) school, then went on to Fourah Bay Institution, located in Freetown, graduating in 1858.

Career

He was a school teacher until 1863, when he entered the ministry.

The CMS was impressed by Johnson's potential, and sent him to its Yoruba mission in Nigeria, first in Lagos and then in Abeokuta. He was unsuccessful as a missionary, perhaps because of his rigid morality, and in 1880 was instead appointed pastor of the Breadfruit Church in Lagos.

When the Lagos Colony was separated from the Gold Coast in 1886, the legislative council of the new colony was composed of four official and three unofficial members. Lagos Colony Governor Alfred Moloney nominated two Africans as unofficial representatives, Johnson and the trader Charles Joseph George.

In 1900, Johnson was consecrated a bishop, to serve as an Assistant Bishop in the Diocese of Western Equatorial Africa with oversight of the Niger Delta and Benin territories, holding this post until his death in 1917.

He believed in a puritan, evangelistic Christianity, but was hostile to other aspects of European culture which he felt were not suitable to Africa.

Johnson received the degree Doctor of Divinity (DD) from the Durham University in March 1900.

See also

 List of Christian missionaries
 List of Nigerians
 List of Sierra Leoneans

References
Notes

Bibliography

Year of birth uncertain
Date of birth missing
Place of birth missing
Date of death missing
Place of death missing
1830s births
1917 deaths
19th-century Nigerian people
19th-century Nigerian educators
19th-century politicians
19th-century Protestant religious leaders
20th-century Nigerian politicians
20th-century Protestant religious leaders
Fourah Bay College alumni
Nigerian Anglican missionaries
Nigerian Christian clergy
Nigerian schoolteachers
Sierra Leone Creole people
Sierra Leonean clergy
Yoruba Christian clergy
Sierra Leonean people of Yoruba descent
Yoruba politicians
Sierra Leonean people of Nigerian descent
History of Lagos
Sierra Leonean emigrants to Nigeria
Saro people
People from colonial Nigeria
Yoruba educators
Anglican missionaries in Nigeria